Clayton Mountain is located in the Absaroka Range in the U.S. state of Wyoming. On August 21, 1937, fifteen firefighters were killed on the west slopes of Clayton Mountain while fighting the Blackwater fire. The peak was named after United States Forest Service (USFS) ranger Alfred G. Clayton, who perished along with members of his crew during the fire. Two memorials were constructed in 1938 by the Civilian Conservation Corps (CCC) on the west slope of Clayton Mountain to commemorate the locations where members of the CCC and the USFS perished.

References

Mountains of Wyoming
Mountains of Park County, Wyoming
Shoshone National Forest